Liam Johnson (born 12 May 1997) is an English former professional rugby league footballer who last played as a  or  for the Sheffield Eagles in RFL Championship.

Background
Johnson was born in Huddersfield, West Yorkshire, England.

Career
Johnson has had previous loan spells with the Sheffield Eagles and Oldham (Heritage № 1356), in the Kingstone Press Championship.

In November 2017 he signed a one-year loan deal with the Bradford Bulls.

In November 2018 he signed for the Dewsbury Rams.

On 16 Oct 2020 he signed for Doncaster in RFL League 1.

In November 2021 he signed a two-year deal with Sheffield Eagles.

References

External links
Huddersfield Giants profile
Bradford Bulls profile

1997 births
Living people
Bradford Bulls players
British firefighters
Dewsbury Rams players
Doncaster R.L.F.C. players
English rugby league players
Huddersfield Giants players
Oldham R.L.F.C. players
Rugby league players from Huddersfield
Rugby league second-rows
Sheffield Eagles players